F. K. Cadman was a founding member of the Socialist Party of Great Britain.

Cadman left the Party early on but rejoined on 14 December 1908. He was Battersea branch secretary from 1911 to 1913. He was still a member in the early 1920s and is mentioned with Jack Fitzgerald in Harry Wicks's Keeping My Head as one of the SPGB's bricklayer propagandists. He left the Party some time after 1931.

References
Socialist Party of Great Britain 1904–1913 membership register
Harry Wicks. Keeping My Head.

19th-century births
20th-century deaths
Socialist Party of Great Britain members
British bricklayers